The Queen of the South Stakes is a South Australian Jockey Club Group 2 Thoroughbred horse race for fillies and mares, three years old and up, at set weights with penalties, over a distance of 1600 metres held at Morphettville Racecourse in Adelaide, Australia during the SAJC Autumn Carnival.

History

Name
 1981 - Breeders' Matchmaker Stakes
1982–1990 - Queen of the South Stakes
1991–1992 - Southwark Premium Classic
1993–1999 - Sedgwick Classic
2000–2005 - Marsh Classic
 2006 - Coolmore Mile
 2007 - Waterford Wedgwood Trophy
2008 onwards - Queen of the South Stakes

Grade
1982–1985 - Listed Race
 1986 - Group 3
1987 onwards - Group 2

Distance
 1981 - 1500 metres (held at Victoria Park)
1982 onwards - 1600 metres

Records

The race record time for running of the 1600 metres is held by Shavano Miss in a time of 1:34.55 in 1991.

Most wins by a trainer - 6 times: 
Colin S, Hayes - 1981, 1983–85, 1989–90

Winners

 2022 - Silent Sovereign
 2021 - Fabric
 2020 - Shrouded In Mist
 2019 - Music Bay
 2018 - French Emotion
 2017 - Amelie's Star
 2016 - Into The Mist
 2015 - Atlantis Dream
 2014 - Tango's Daughter
 2013 - Star of Giselle
 2012 - So Pristine
 2011 - Goon Serpent
 2010 - Returntosender
 2009 - Bird of Fire
 2008 - Trick Of Light
 2007 - Cinque Cento
 2006 - Open Cut
 2005 - Hidden Strings
 2004 - Jameela
 2003 - Sylvaner
 2002 - Sylvaner
 2001 - Lady Marion
 2000 - La Zoffany
 1999 - Noircir
 1998 - Spectrum
 1997 - Miss Tessla
 1996 - Saleous
 1995 - Our Marquise
 1994 - Ausmart
 1993 - San Pauli Girl
 1992 - Shavano Miss
 1991 - Shavano Miss
 1990 - Memphis Blues
 1989 - Memphis Blues
 1988 - Adraanito
 1987 - Goblet
 1986 - Canny Lass
 1985 - Star Style Girl
 1984 - Casey Belle
 1983 - Corona Miss
 1982 - Rose Of Kingston
 1981 - Parisian Romp

See also
 List of Australian Group races
 Group races

References

Horse races in Australia
Sport in Adelaide